The women's 3000 meter at the 2015 KNSB Dutch Single Distance Championships took place in Heerenveen at the Thialf ice skating rink on Saturday 1 November 2014. Although this tournament was held in 2014, it was part of the 2014–2015 speed skating season.

There were 20 participants.

Title holder was Ireen Wüst.

There was qualification selection available for the next following 2014–15 ISU Speed Skating World Cup tournaments.

Result

Source:

References

Single Distance Championships
2015 Single Distance
World